Charles Schiewitz was a member of the Wisconsin State Assembly.

Biography
Schiewitz was born on March 4, 1885. He resided in Milwaukee, Wisconsin.

Career
Schiewitz was elected to the Assembly in 1916. He was a Republican.

References

Politicians from Milwaukee
Republican Party members of the Wisconsin State Assembly
1885 births
Year of death missing